Longana is a village located on the eastern part of Ambae island in Penama Province, Vanuatu.

Saratamata
Saratamata, the headquarters of Penama province, is on this part of the island.  A  plan has been proposed by the provincial Government to develop this area into a town.

Transportation
The village is served by Longana Airport, IATA code LOD.

References

External Links 
 A related paper

Populated places in Vanuatu
Penama Province